UE News (1939–1952) is the tabloid newspaper of the United Electrical, Radio and Machine Workers of America.

External links
UE News Online
UE News Photograph Collection at the University of Pittsburgh
UE News 1939-2010

Newspapers established in 1939
Newspapers published in Pennsylvania
1939 establishments in Pennsylvania